Cragin may refer to:

Cragin (Metra station), a former transit station in Milwaukee
Aaron H. Cragin, a United States Representative and Senator from New Hampshire
William Cragin, an American tennis player

See also
Belmont Cragin, Chicago